Angora Airport  is an airstrip  north-northwest of San Ignacio de Moxos in the Beni Department of Bolivia.

See also

Transport in Bolivia
List of airports in Bolivia

References

External links 
OpenStreetMap - Angora
OurAirports - Angora
Fallingrain - Angora Airport
HERE/Nokia Maps - Angora

Airports in Beni Department